Sulur taluk is a taluk of Coimbatore district of the Indian state of Tamil Nadu. The headquarters is the town of Sulur. This revenue block consist of 41 revenue villages.

Demographics
According to the 2011 census, the taluk of Sulur had a population of 320,406 with 160,677 males and 159,729 females. There were 994 women for every 1,000 men. The taluk had a literacy rate of 73.9%. Child population in the age group below 6 years were 13,678 Males and 13,162 Females.

See also
Vadambacheri

References 

Taluks of Coimbatore district